Gymnothorax pindae is a moray eel found in coral reefs in the Pacific and Indian Oceans. It was first named by Smith in 1962, and is commonly known as the Pinda moray.

References

pindae
Fish described in 1962